Okkenhaug is a village in the municipality of Levanger in Trøndelag county, Norway. Okkenhaug Church is located here and the historic ruins of the Munkeby Abbey are located nearby.

References

Villages in Trøndelag
Levanger